The tibiotarsus is the large bone between the femur and the tarsometatarsus in the leg of a bird. It is the fusion of the proximal part of the tarsus with the tibia.

A similar structure also occurred in the Mesozoic Heterodontosauridae. These small ornithischian dinosaurs were unrelated to birds and the similarity of their foot bones is best explained by convergent evolution.

See also
Bird anatomy

References
 Proctor, Nobel S. Manual of Ornithology: Avian Structure and Function. Yale University Press. (1993) 

Bird anatomy